William G. Folden (born April 5, 1972) is an American politician who is currently a Republican member of the Maryland Senate, representing District 4 since 2023. He was previously a member of the Maryland House of Delegates, representing District 3B from 2015 to 2019.

Background
Folden was born in Hagerstown, Maryland, and graduated from nearby Governor Thomas Johnson High School. He later attended Frederick Community College, where he earned an A.A. degree in criminal justice. Folden also served in the United States Army in the military police corps and as a infantry sniper. From 1994 to 2011, Folden served as the deputy sheriff of Frederick County, and has served as a police officer for the city of Frederick since 2011, even working as an officer while in the Maryland legislature.

Political career
In 2006, Folden announced his candidacy for Frederick County Sheriff, challenging incumbent Republican sheriff Chuck Jenkins. He was defeated by Jenkins in the Republican primary, coming in third with 21.16 percent of the vote.

In June 2021, Folden filed for the House of Delegates race in District 4. In September 2021, he withdrew his bid for delegate and entered the Senate race in District 4 for the seat being vacated by Michael Hough. He won the state senate election on November 8, 2022, by a margin of 57.54% to 42.36%.

House of Delegates

Folden was sworn into the Maryland House of Delegates on January 14, 2015. He served in this position until January 9, 2019, after being defeated by Democratic challenger Ken Kerr in the 2018 Maryland House of Delegates election. He was the only active police officer in the state legislature.

Committees and caucuses
 Member, Judiciary Committee, 2015 (family law subcommittee, 2015); Environment and Transportation Committee, 2015–2019 (housing & real property subcommittee, 2015–19; land use & ethics subcommittee, 2015–19; motor vehicle & transportation subcommittee, 2017–2019)
 Member, Public Safety and Policing Work Group, 2015–2016
 Chair, Frederick County Delegation, 2018–2019 (vice-chair, 2017)
 Member, Maryland Legislative Sportsmen's Caucus, 2015–2019
 Maryland Veterans Caucus, 2015–2019

Maryland Senate
Folden was sworn into the Maryland Senate on January 11, 2023. He is a member of the Judicial Proceedings Committee.

Personal life
Folden is married and has three children.

Political positions

Education
During the 2017 legislative session, Folden introduced a bill that would provide state funding to and relax restrictions on the state's charter schools.

Housing
During the 2017 legislative session, Folden introduced a bill that would allow military members to end their housing leases early if deployed or called to a new duty station. The bill passed the House of Delegates unanimously.

Guns
In January 2018, Folden said he supported a bill that would prohibit people convicted of domestic abuse from having access to firearms.

National politics
During the 2016 Republican Party presidential primaries, Folden endorsed Ted Cruz and served on the Cruz for Maryland Leadership Team.

Policing
In July 2015, following the Baltimore protests earlier that year, Folden sent a letter to the co-chairs of the Public Safety and Policing Work Group requesting that Baltimore mayor Stephanie Rawlings-Blake testify about the city's tactical response.

During the 2017 legislative session, Folden introduced a bill that would create the Maryland Police Training Commission to develop a lethality screening protocol and training to use when investigating complains of domestic violence and assault by strangulation, which was signed by Governor Larry Hogan in May 2016.

During the 2018 legislative session, Folden introduced a bill that would train emergency responders on how to properly handle interactions with veterans affected by trauma.

Social issues
During the 2017 legislative session, Folden voted against a joint resolution that would allow the Attorney General of Maryland to file lawsuits against the federal government, saying that he opposed the expanded powers because the Attorney General did not have these powers when they were elected.

In October 2018, Folden called for an independent review of complaints against Frederick Community College president Elizabeth Burmaster, which claimed that she had been verbally and physically abusive toward faculty and administrators at the college. Later that month, the community college board of trustees voted to request an investigation into the complaints.

Transportation
During the 2017 legislative session, Folden introduced a bill that would make it illegal to drive in the far left lane of a highway unless the driver was passing another vehicle. The bill passed the House of Delegates by a 73-66 vote, but failed to move in the state senate. Folden reintroduced the bill during the 2018 legislative session, where it failed to move out of committee.

Electoral history

References

External links
 

Republican Party members of the Maryland House of Delegates
Living people
1972 births
Politicians from Hagerstown, Maryland
21st-century American politicians
Republican Party Maryland state senators